She Wrote the Book is a 1946 American comedy film directed by Charles Lamont and starring Joan Davis, Jack Oakie, and Mischa Auer. The screenplay concerns a shy midwestern professor who travels to New York City to visit a publisher of her friend's book which turns out to be a racy bestseller.

Plot

Jane Featherstone (Joan Davis) is a buttoned-down and pedestrian professor at small town Croyden College in Great Falls, Indiana who is making plans to present a paper in New York City. While talking to her dean's wife, Phyllis Fowler, she discovers that Fowler is actually the author of the racy best selling novel Always Lulu, under the pen name Lulu Winters.  Fowler asks Featherstone to assume her faux identity in order to pickup her royalty checks while in New York, and Featherstone reluctantly agrees to pickup the $80,000 which Fowler has promised to donate to the college which is struggling financially.  While traveling on the train to New York, Featherstone meets Eddie Caldwell, a charming engineer, and the two agree to a date once they reach the big city.

Once they arrive Featherstone is greeted by publisher George Dixon and Jerry Marlowe, his advertising executive.  Dixon and Marlowe attempt to escort her to an unexpected reception for Lulu.  Featherstone tries to escape, but cracks her head in the process, and develops amnesia.  Marlowe thinks she is Lulu, and Featherstone now believes she really is, which leads her to believe that the sultry novel is actually an autobiography of her life. When Featherstone, as Lulu, informs everyone at the press conference that she has no plans to write a sequel, Dixon and Marlowe hatch a scheme to spend the $80,000.  Meanwhile Caldwell believes that Featherstone actually is the promiscuous Lulu, and ends the budding relationship.  A bartender masquerading as a Count, an enamored shipping magnate, and photos that are seen back in Great Falls add twists and turns to the plot.  Eventually Featherstone returns home broke, but does recover her memory.

Now the Fowlers and Featherstone must devise a plot to recover the money, or stand by and watch the college close due to lack of funds.  Featherstone returns to New York and dons the guise of Lulu once more.  She gets the money back, and reconciles with Caldwell, who then returns to Great Falls with her.

Partial cast
 Joan Davis as Jane Featherstone 
 Jack Oakie as Jerry Marlowe 
 Mischa Auer as Joe 
 Kirby Grant as Eddie Caldwell 
 Jacqueline deWit as Millicent Van Cleve 
 Gloria Stuart as Phyllis Fowler 
 Thurston Hall as Horace Van Cleve 
 John Litel as Dean Fowler 
 Lewis L. Russell as George Dixon 
 Cora Witherspoon as Carrothers
 Selmer Jackson as Fielding 
 Frank Dae as Professor

References

Bibliography
 Stephens, Michael L. Art Directors in Cinema: A Worldwide Biographical Dictionary. McFarland, 1998.

External links
 
 

1946 films
1946 comedy films
American comedy films
Films directed by Charles Lamont
Universal Pictures films
American black-and-white films
1940s English-language films
1940s American films